Amidou Fadel Keïta (born 5 July 1977) is an Ivorian former footballer who played as a striker.

Club career 
Keïta was born in Gagnoa, Ivory Coast. He began his career at Africa Sports, where he was twice the best goal scorer of the Ivory Coast Championship.

In 2000, he joined Turkish club Çaykur Rizespor.

Honours
Africa Sports: league champion 1999; cup champion 1998, 2002

International career 
Keïta played for the Ivory Coast national team during the 2002 FIFA World Cup qualification and scored a goal in a 6–0 win against  Madagascar national team on 1 July 2001.

Personal life 
Fadel is the older brother of 2006 World Cup player Abdul Kader Keïta. Following his retirement he settled in Lille, France.

References

1977 births
Living people
People from Gagnoa
Association football forwards
Ivorian footballers
Ivory Coast international footballers
Africa Sports d'Abidjan players
Çaykur Rizespor footballers
Al Nassr FC players
Expatriate footballers in Turkey
Ivorian expatriate sportspeople in Turkey
Entente Feignies Aulnoye FC players
Expatriate footballers in Saudi Arabia
Ivorian expatriate sportspeople in Saudi Arabia
Süper Lig players
Saudi Professional League players